Babhnan railway station is a railway station in Basti district, Uttar Pradesh. Its code is BV. Basti railway station is 30 km from Babhnan station. It serves Babhnan. The station consists of two platforms, station has good facilities like a retiring room.
Many express and super fast trains like Kushinagar Super Fast Express, LTT-GKP Santkabir Dham Super Fast Express, Intercity Super Fast Express, Guwahati-Jammu Tawi Amarnath Express, Patliputra Special Express, Shaheed Express, Manwar Sangam Express, Gwalior-Barauni Mail, Satyagrah Express, Krishak Express, Barauni-Lucknow Express, Avadh Express, Ayodhya-Gorakhpur Passenger, Gonda-Gorakhpur Passenger halt at this railway station.

References

Railway stations in Basti district
Lucknow NER railway division